Bokajan Assembly constituency is one of the 126 constituencies of the Assam Legislative Assembly in India. Bokajan forms a part of the Autonomous District Lok Sabha constituency. This seat is reserved for the Scheduled Tribes (ST).

Town Details

Following are details on Bokajan Assembly constituency-

Country: India.
 State: Assam.
 District: Karbi Anglong district .
 Lok Sabha Constituency:  Tezpur Lok Sabha/Parliamentary constituency.
 Assembly Categorisation: Rural
 Literacy Level:  86.02%.
 Eligible Electors as per 2021 General Elections: 1,50,315 Eligible Electors. Male Electors:76,350 . Female Electors: 73,965 .
 Geographic Co-Ordinates:26°18'16.9"N 93°38'02.0"E.
 Total Area Covered: 2356 square kilometres.
 Area Includes:  Bokajan thana in Diphu sub-division.. It shares an inter-state border with Karbi Anglong, of Karbi Anglong district of Assam.
 Inter State Border :  Karbi Anglong.
 Number Of Polling Stations: Year 2011-149,Year 2016-175,Year 2021-17.

Members of Legislative Assembly 

Following is the list of past members representing Biswanath Assembly constituency in Assam Legislature.

 1967: S. S. Terang, Indian National Congress.
 1972: S. S. Terang, Indian National Congress.
 1978: Bilton Momin, Janata Party.
 1983: Rajen Timung, Indian National Congress.
 1985: Rajen Timung, Indian National Congress.
 1991: Mansing Rongpi, Autonomous State Demand Committee.
 1996: Jagat Sing Engti, Autonomous State Demand Committee.
 2001: Jagat Sing Engti, Autonomous State Demand Committee (United).
 2006: Jagat Sing Engti, Autonomous State Demand Committee.
 2011: Klengdoon Engti, Indian National Congress.
 2016: Numal Momin, Bharatiya Janata Party.
 2021: Numal Momin, Bharatiya Janata Party.

Election results

2021 results

2016 results

2011 results

See also
 Bokajan
 Diphu
 Autonomous District Lok Sabha constituency
 Karbi Anglong district

References

External links 
 

Assembly constituencies of Assam